Aylard is a surname. Notable people with the surname include:

 Joyce Aylard (1925–2022), codebreaker at Eastcote, an outstation of Bletchley Park, during World War II
 Richard Aylard (born 1952), British Royal Navy officer

See also
 Allard (surname)